NGC 2240 is an open cluster in the constellation Auriga. It was discovered by William Herschel on January 3, 1786, and is located about 5.1 thousand light-years away.

References

External links 
 

Open clusters
Auriga (constellation)
2240